The Women's uneven bars event took place on 7 October 2010 at the Indira Gandhi Arena.

Final

Kristin Klarenbach withdrew from the final at the last minute, so there were only seven competitors here.

References
Results

Gymnastics at the 2010 Commonwealth Games
2010 in women's gymnastics